Code page 1016 (CCSID 1016), also known as CP1016, is IBM's code page for the Norwegian version of ISO 646.

Codepage layout

See also
Code page 1107 (similar DEC-NRCS code page)

References

1016
Norwegian language